The Lourdes Formation is a geologic formation in Georgia. It preserves fossils dating back to the Ordovician period.

See also

 List of fossiliferous stratigraphic units in Georgia (U.S. state)
 Paleontology in Georgia (U.S. state)

References
 

Ordovician Georgia (U.S. state)
Ordovician southern paleotemperate deposits